Kyide Nyimagon, whose original name was Khri-skyid-lding, was a member of the Yarlung dynasty of Tibet and a descendant of emperor Langdarma. He migrated to Western Tibet and  founded the kingdom of Ngari Khorsum ("the three divisions of Ngari") around 912 CE. After his death, his large kingdom was divided among his three sons, giving rise to the three kingdoms of Maryul (Ladakh), Guge-Purang and Zanskar-Spiti.

Family 
Ösung's son Depal Khortsen (–) is believed to have controlled most or part of Central Tibet.

Nyimagon was one of the sons of Depal Khortsen, the other being Trashi Tsentsän (bKraśis-brtsegs-brtsan). Both the sons fled Ü-Tsang (Central Tibet) in 910 when their father was murdered, at the end of the 3rd , which is taken to mark the beginning of the Tibetan Era of Fragmentation.

Reign 

According to Ladakhi chronicles, Nyimagon reached Tö Ngari ("Upper Ngari")  with only a hundred followers. But within a comparatively short time he established a large kingdom spanning Ladakh, Zanskar, Lahul, Spiti, Guge and Purang.

Nyimagon established a small kingdom in Rala, near Shiquanhe in the Sengge Zangbo valley, in or around 912. He is said to have started by building a Kharmar (reddish fort) at Rala in the Horse year, another called Rtse-śp-rgya-ri in the Sheep year. The chronicles say he thought of causing many villages and hamlets to  be built throughout the broad valleys of Dam and Lag (unidentified, but presumed to be connected to the Sutlej valley, later known as Guge). But he is said to have left Maryul (Ladakh) undisturbed.

Ater his establishment, Dge-bśes-btsan invited him to Purang and offered him his daughter Bro-za 'Khor-skyoṅ as wife. Nyimagon married her and had three sons.
August Hermann Francke, who translated the Ladakhi Chronicles, proposed that '''Khor-skyoṅ must have been the only daughter of the king of Purang.  After his death, Nyimagon must have inherited his kingdom in addition to his own territories.

Scholar Luciano Petech noted that the king of Purang belonged to the powerful Bro'' family of western Tibet, which had survived from the old Zhangzhung empire, and supplied queens and ministers to the Yarlung kings. The influence of wife's family as well as his own royal lineage would have contributed to Nyimagon's success in building a large kingdom.

The eldest son Palgyigon is seen to have expanded the kingdom to Ladakh, during the lifetime of his father. The land was at that time called Maryul and included Rudok.

Succession 

Nyimagon died around 930.

He divided his kingdom across his three sons. He gave Palgyigon, his eldest son, the kingdom of Maryul (now known as Ladakh). These three countries together came to be called "Ngari Khorsum".

Tashigön's son Yeshe-Ö, who inherited Guge-Purang in 967, abdicated in 975 and became a lama. He founded the Tholing Monastery, which became the premier centre for Buddhist learning and a key enabler of the Second diffusion of Buddhism to Tibet.

In Ladakh, the Tibetan language and culture came to replace the culture of Brokpa and Mons, through the rule of Nyimagon's descendants as well as the influence of Tibetan Buddhism.

Notes

References

Bibliography 
 
 
 
 
 
 
 
 
 
 
 
 
 
 

History of Ladakh
History of Tibet
People related to Lahaul and Spiti district